Theodore Wilkinson may refer to:

Theodore Stark Wilkinson (politician) (1847–1921), U.S. Representative from Louisiana
Theodore Stark Wilkinson (1888–1946), United States Navy admiral and Medal of Honor recipient

See also
Wilkinson (surname)